Janusz Michallik (born April 22, 1966 in Chorzów, Poland) is a Polish-American retired soccer defender, current soccer coach and television sports commentator.

Youth
Michallik moved to the United States with his father Krystian, a former Polish national team player, at the age of 16.  His father had previously spent time in the U.S. in 1976 when he played for the Hartford Bicentennials of the North American Soccer League. While Michallik played for the junior Polish national team, he never played for the senior team, making him eligible for the U.S. team once he gained his citizenship.

Professional
In 1983, Michallik began his professional career with Gwardia Warszawa.  He played 10 games before his family moved to the U.S.  In 1984, he signed with the Cleveland Force of the Major Indoor Soccer League (MISL) and played a single season with the team.  He continued to play indoor soccer with his next two teams, the Louisville Thunder and Canton Invaders of the American Indoor Soccer Association (AISA), winning championships with them both despite only playing one season with each team.  In 1988, he tried out with the Dallas Sidekicks of MISL, but while he played in the pre-season he was not offered a contract by the team.  In 1990, Michallik moved to outdoor soccer with the Boston Bolts of the newly established American Professional Soccer League (APSL). In the fall of 1990, he signed with the Atlanta Attack of the AISA.  In 1992, he played for the amateur Gremio Lusitano. In 1995, he signed with the Connecticut Wolves of USISL.  He played several early season games with the Wolves, then went on loan to the New York Centaurs of the A-League.

In 1996, the Columbus Crew of Major League Soccer drafted Michallik in the 7th Round (61st overall) of the Inaugural MLS draft. He played two seasons with the Crew before signing with the New England Revolution on January 16, 1998, for whom he played one season before being released on October 31, 1998.

National team
Michallik became a U.S. citizen on March 8, 1991. U.S. coach Bora Milutinovic quickly called him into the national team. That year, he was part of the team which won the 1991 CONCACAF championship.  In August 1991, he signed a contract to play exclusively for the national team.  In 1992, he tasted victory again when the U.S. team won that year's U.S. Cup. He went on to earn 44 caps and score a single goal as a tough defender. He was key to the U.S. preparation for the 1994 World Cup, playing in 12 pre-tournament games and starting in seven. As hosts of the 1994 World Cup, the United States qualified automatically, thus not having to qualify through the CONCACAF region's qualification tournament, and he was frequently summoned for friendlies, which he scored his first and only international goal for the United States in a 2–0 away triumph over Saudi Arabia in Riyadh. However, he was left off the roster for the tournament itself and retired from the national team later that year.

International goals

Futsal
In 1995, Michallik earned five caps and scored 1 goal with the U.S. futsal team.

Life after retirement
He currently lives in  Glastonbury, Connecticut, with his wife, Marzena and son, Daniel, who played collegiate soccer for the DePaul Blue Demons. He is a soccer commentator, currently working for ESPN and SiriusXM. He is also an expert for the Polish Television, TVP Sport. He also is a frequent guest on Polish YouTube channel Kanał Sportowy.

Honors
In 2002, he was inducted into the Connecticut Soccer Hall of Fame
In 2009, he was inducted into the New England Soccer Hall of Fame

References

External links
 U.S.SoccerPlayers.com bio

1966 births
Living people
American Indoor Soccer Association players
American Professional Soccer League players
American soccer players
American men's futsal players
American soccer coaches
American sports announcers
Atlanta Attack players
Boston Bolts players
Canton Invaders players
Cleveland Force (original MISL) players
Columbus Crew players
Connecticut Wolves players
Gremio Lusitano players
Gwardia Warsaw players
Association football commentators
Association football defenders
Louisville Thunder players
Major Indoor Soccer League (1978–1992) players
Major League Soccer players
Major Soccer League players
National Professional Soccer League (1984–2001) players
New York Centaurs players
New England Revolution players
Polish footballers
Poland youth international footballers
Sportspeople from Chorzów
Polish emigrants to the United States
USL Second Division players
United States men's international soccer players
1991 CONCACAF Gold Cup players
1992 King Fahd Cup players
CONCACAF Gold Cup-winning players